Hacène Lalmas  (12 March 1943 – 7 July 2018), also known as El Kebch (The Ram), was an Algerian footballer who played as a midfielder.

Lalmas scored a record 131 goals in the Algerian championship. He was also voted as the 14th-best African player of all-time by the CAF.

Club career
Although he started his career with OM Ruisseau, Lalmas played most of his career for CR Belouizdad and it was with CRB. He led the club to four league titles, three cup titles and three Maghreb Champions Cup titles.

Career statistics

International
Scores and results list Algeria's goal tally first. "Score" column indicates the score after the player's goal.

Honours
CR Belouizdad
 Algerian league: 1965, 1966, 1970, 1971
 Algerian Cup: 1966, 1969, 1970
 Maghreb Champions Cup: 1970, 1971, 1972
Individual
 Algerian league top scorer: 1969–70

References

External links
 Hacene LALMAS

1943 births
2018 deaths
Algerian footballers
Algeria international footballers
Kabyle people
Footballers from Algiers
CR Belouizdad players
OMR El Annasser players
Competitors at the 1967 Mediterranean Games
1968 African Cup of Nations players
Association football midfielders
Mediterranean Games competitors for Algeria
Footballers at the 1965 All-Africa Games
African Games competitors for Algeria
21st-century Algerian people